The Goonies is a puzzle-platform game programmed by Scott Spanburg and published in 1985 by Datasoft. It is based on the Richard Donner film The Goonies (1985).

Gameplay

The game has eight stages, each based on a scene from the film. In each stage, the two Goonies must work together to solve puzzles and reach the exit to move on to the next stage. In single-player mode the joystick button can be used to switch between the two characters, and in the two player mode, each player controls one Goonie.

Reception
The game received positive reviews. Computer and Video Games reviewer said, "Each screen is packed with interesting puzzles and problems. The attention to detail is good - and the game is fun to play". Computer Gamer magazine said, "Even if it doesn't break all software records, it's one of the best platform games I've played."

References

External links

Review in Antic
Review in ANALOG Computing
Review in Compute!
Review in Page 6
Review in Compute!'s Gazette

1985 video games
Amstrad CPC games
Apple II games
Atari 8-bit family games
Commodore 64 games
Datasoft games
Puzzle-platform games
Video games based on films
Video games developed in the United States
ZX Spectrum games
U.S. Gold games